Canada's Largest Ribfest is the name of an annual ribfest food festival held in Spencer Smith Park by the lake shore in Burlington, Ontario. The Burlington Lakeshore Rotary Club organizes the four-day-long Ribfest to raise money for charity during the Labour Day weekend.

History

The Burlington Lakeshore Rotary Club held the first Ribfest in 1996, then simply called the Ribfest.

By 2001, the festival had expanded to include ribs from 12 traveling rib teams.

The 2004 festival anticipated about 150,000 people eating 36 tonnes of ribs. It was called the Maple Leaf Pork Rotary Ribfest that year.

In early 2009, the Burlington Ribfest rebranded itself as "Canada's Largest Ribfest"—with its logo redesigned by Little Green Tree. In September, 175,000 people and 18 rib teams attended the 14th annual Canada's Largest Ribfest, consuming 150,000 lbs of ribs over the weekend. An estimated $320,000 was raised for local charities.

In 2010, the Canadian Federal government provided Can$98,610 in funding for the Ribfest as part of a Can$100 million Marquee Tourism Events Program fund.

2020, 2021 and 2022 saw drive-thru Ribfests due to the COVID-19 pandemic restrictions.

Economic impact

In 2003, an economic study was conducted on "Canada's Largest Ribfest." It found that almost 50% of visitors to the Ribfest come from outside Burlington. About 100% of those who came to the Ribfest would recommend it to out-of-town friends and/or relatives. About 69% said they would attend in 2007. About $1.8 million is being spent in the region by consumers.

Charitable fundraising

The Ribfest's funds are split to local organizations, business, and hospitals.

This is some of them:
Scouts Canada
Rotary Youth Leadership Awards
Scholarships and Bursaries
Burlington Teen Tour Band
Burlington Art Centre
Salvation Army
The Carpenter Hospice
Rotary Music festival
Burlington International Games
Partnership West Food Bank
Joseph Brant Hospital
Children's Assessment & Treatment Centre
Habitat for Humanity

See also
 Burlington Sound of Music

References

 11. https://en.wikivoyage.org/wiki/Burlington_(Ontario)#Events

External links
Canada's Largest Ribfest

Festivals in Ontario
Burlington, Ontario
Food and drink festivals in Canada
Tourist attractions in the Regional Municipality of Halton